Mark P. Gorenberg is an American venture capitalist, currently a managing director of San Francisco-based Zetta Venture Partners. He is an active political fundraiser for Democratic Party candidates.

Education 
Gorenberg received a B.S. from MIT (1976), an M.S. in electrical engineering from the University of Minnesota (1979), and an M.S. in engineering management from Stanford University (1984). He was a member of the original SPARCstation 1 team at Sun Microsystems.

Career 
Gorenberg joined Hummer Winblad, a venture capital firm that invests exclusively in software companies, soon after its 1989 founding by John Hummer and Ann Winblad. His successful startups include Omniture (IPO and acquired by Adobe), AdForce (IPO and acquired by CMGI), NetDynamics (acquired by Sun Microsystems) and Scopus Technologies (IPO and acquired by Siebel). In addition to this list, Mark has continued to be an active investor in the startup and tech space, with recent investments in companies like Domo and Pixlee.

A member of the MIT Board of Trustees, Gorenberg has made major gifts to MIT.  He also serves on several other charitable boards, including the H. John Heinz III Center for Science, Economics and The Environment. Gorenberg is a member of the FCC's Technology Advisory Council. In 2011, President Obama appointed him as a member of the President's Council of Advisors on Science and Technology (PCAST).

Gorenberg oversaw California fundraising for Senator John F. Kerry's 2004 presidential campaign.  He was a member of then-candidate Obama's national finance committee in the 2008 Presidential campaign, raising more than $500,000 as a so-called "bundler" of individual contributions.  Gorenberg stated that he had been introduced to the Obama campaign by disgraced donor Norman Hsu. In the course of the Hsu investigation, no allegations were ever made that Mr. Gorenberg was aware of Hsu's unethical activities, and Gorenberg never made any effort to hide the basic fact of the introduction.

References

American venture capitalists
University of Minnesota College of Science and Engineering alumni
Living people
Year of birth missing (living people)
Massachusetts Institute of Technology alumni
Stanford University School of Engineering alumni